Qin Tian (born 1957) is a lieutenant general of the Chinese People's Armed Police (PAP). He is a member of the Standing Committee of the Party Committee People's Armed Police, Vice Commander of the People's Armed Police, former Chief of Staff of the People's Armed Police from 2015 to 2017.

Biography
He was born in Hong'an, Huanggang, Hubei Province. In 1973, he to join the military. He had worked for People's Liberation Army General Armaments Department and then PLA National Defence University.

In July 2015, Qin Tian was appointed as the Vice president of the PLA Academy of Military Science.

In December 2015, Qin Tian was promoted to Chief of Staff of the People's Armed Police. In July 2016, he was promoted police rank lieutenant general of PAP.

In September 2017, he became Vice Commander of the People's Armed Police. On February 5, 2018, Qin Tian was elected as a member of the Standing Committee of the Party Committee People's Armed Police.

Family
Qin Tian is the son of Qin Jiwei, was a general, former Minister of National Defense. His brother is Qin Weijiang, a lieutenant general of the People's Liberation Army.

References

1957 births
Living people
People's Liberation Army generals from Hubei
People from Huanggang